Marcel Matis (born in Romania) is a retired Romanian footballer.

References

Romanian footballers
Living people
Association football midfielders
Cincinnati Riverhawks players
Cincinnati Kings players
Year of birth missing (living people)